Black Joke was a ship built in 1720 or 1743. She appeared in Lloyd's Register (LR) in the issue for 1764.

Between 1764 and 1767 she made three complete voyages from Liverpool as a slave ship.

1st slave voyage (1764): Captain Joseph Pollard sailed from Liverpool on 5 March 1764, bound for the Gambia. Black Joke arrived in Dominica later that year with 90 slaves.

2nd slave voyage (1765–1766): Captain Pollard sailed from Liverpool on 18 February 1765, bound for the Gambia. Black Joke arrived in South Carolina on 1 June with 90 slaves. She arrived back at Liverpool on 16 January 1766. She had left Liverpool with 15 crew members and she had suffered eight crew deaths on her voyage.

3rd slave voyage (1766–1767): Captain Thomas Marshall sailed from Liverpool on 11 April 1766 and started acquiring slaves at the Gambia in May. Black Joke arrived at Barbados on 8 October 1767 with 61 slaves. She arrived back at Liverpool on 12 January 1767.

Citations and references
Citations

References

1720s ships
Age of Sail merchant ships of England
Liverpool slave ships